Kelbessos was a fortified settlement of ancient Lycia, in the territory of Termessos. It was continually inhabited by a military garrison from Hellenistic to Roman times.

Its site is located in the Bey Mountains of Asian Turkey. Excavations have discovered coins, necropoleis, and inscriptions, and are on-going.

References

Populated places in ancient Lycia
Former populated places in Turkey
Ancient Greek archaeological sites in Turkey
Roman sites in Turkey